Coorabie is a town and locality in the Australian state of South Australia located about   north-west of the state capital of Adelaide. It is outside of district council boundaries, and therefore managed by the Outback Communities Authority. It is located in the west of South Australia, and includes the Wahgunyah Conservation Park. The Eyre Highway passes through the locality, although the Coorabie township is south of the highway.

The 2016 Australian census which was conducted in August 2016 reports that Coorabie shared a population of 51 people with the adjoining locality of Fowlers Bay.

Construction of helicopter landing facilities began in 2015, to serve the BP/Statoil oil exploration project in the Great Australian Bight.

References

Notes

Citations

Towns in South Australia
Places in the unincorporated areas of South Australia